Chandra K. West (born December 31, 1970) is a Canadian actress.

Early life and education
West was born in Edmonton, Alberta, the youngest of eight children. The family moved to  Oak Bay, British Columbia, where she attended Monterey Elementary for three years. The family moved to Oakville, Ontario, where West spent the majority of her youth. When she was 17, West attended a summer acting camp located in Oxford, England. She later went on to study in the Theater Performance Program at Concordia University in Montreal, Quebec.

Career
West's career began in 1991 when she played a small part in the film True Confections, a 1950s conservative drama about a woman with an ahead-of-her-time awareness. West followed her screen debut with a smaller role in the 1993  miniseries The Secrets of Lake Success.

West appeared in three consecutive films; the first as the female-lead in Puppet Master 4 (1993), then a smaller role as Miss Germany in the action film No Contest (1994) also starring Robert Davi and Roddy Piper, and in the same year, reprising her role as Susie in Puppet Master 5: The Final Chapter (1994). The closing months of 1994 and most of 1995 saw West return to television with appearances in Madonna: Innocence Lost (1994), Catwalk (1995), Falling for You (1995) and the role of Mariel Hemingway in Love and Betrayal: The Mia Farrow Story (1995).

Her other film roles of the late 1990s include Veronica Roberts in Universal Soldier II: Brothers in Arms (1998) and Universal Soldier III: Unfinished Business (1998).

Her film breakthrough came when she starred as Val Kilmer's  wife in the 2002 D. J. Caruso crime thriller, The Salton Sea. Following the moderate success of The Salton Sea, West was exposed to a wider market. This role helped her obtain the role of Robin in The First $20 Million Is Always the Hardest, which was panned critically and deemed a major disappointment despite an all-star cast that included Rosario Dawson and Adam Garcia and a script penned by Jon Favreau.

Her next role was as Laura Chandler in the Emmy-nominated mini-series Mister Sterling (2003). From 2003-2004 she portrayed Dr. Jennifer Devlin, girlfriend of John Clark Jr. (Mark-Paul Gosselaar) in a recurring role on NYPD Blue. She played the wife of Michael Keaton in the 2005 horror film White Noise. She also played novice agent Holly Gribbs in the pilot of CSI: Crime Scene Investigation in 2000. West's more recent performances were in the film Canes (later retitled The Covenant: Brotherhood of Evil), which also starred Edward Furlong and Michael Madsen, and as Tina Blake in the HBO series John From Cincinnati. In 2006, West played the lead character Tracy in the film The Last Trimester. In 2007 she played "Dr. Honey" in the movie I Now Pronounce You Chuck and Larry. In 2009, she  starred as the object of a revenge seeking neighbor in the TV movie My Neighbor's Secret.

West had a lead role in the ABC supernatural drama television series The Gates, which premiered in June 2010.

In 2011, she appeared in the made-for-TV movie Burn Notice: The Fall of Sam Axe, based on the television series Burn Notice.

Filmography

Film

Television

References

External links

1970 births
Actresses from Edmonton
Canadian film actresses
Canadian television actresses
Living people
People from Oakville, Ontario